The Wailing Wind is the fifteenth crime fiction novel in the Joe Leaphorn/Jim Chee Navajo Tribal Police series by Tony Hillerman, first published in 2002. It is a New York Times best-seller.

The case of a murdered man, found in a truck on a canyon wash, immediately links to a past shooting and a lost woman tied to myths of lost gold mines, so the retired Joe Leaphorn involves himself along with Bernadette Manuelito of the Navajo Tribal Police.

Plot summary
Navajo Tribal Police Officer Bernadette Manuelito investigates an abandoned vehicle in Apache County, Arizona. She finds the body of Thomas Doherty in the truck. She identifies seeds on his clothing and shoes when checking that he is dead, seeds not from plants nearby. Awaiting an ambulance, Manuelito collects seeds for her garden, placing them in an old tobacco tin she finds nearby. When the body is moved, it becomes clear he was murdered, and the FBI steps in. Manuelito gives the tobacco tin to her boss, now that the area is a crime scene.

Sergeant Jim Chee contacts retired police Lieutenant Joe Leaphorn for advice on how to resolve the problem of the old tin, now evidence removed from a crime scene. This renews Leaphorn's interest in a case involving Wiley Denton, a Gallup oil and gas magnate who shot and killed Marvin McKay. McKay was bringing evidence to Denton of the location of the old Golden Calf gold mine, to earn money from Denton. Denton served time for the killing, claiming self-defense. Denton contacts Leaphorn to find Denton's wife, who disappeared the day of the shooting. After questioning Denton, Leaphorn agrees to search for his wife. First, Leaphorn visits the scene where Doherty's body was found, discreetly replaces the tin with its sand / gold contents, and then points it out to Cowboy Dashee, the officer at the site.

Manuelito finds the place of Doherty's murder, based on the seeds and the ashes from the 1999 fire, and sees old Placer gold mining artifacts. A bullet whizzes past her head, but she sees no shooter. Later, the empty hogan nearby is found to belong to Hostiin James Peshlakai, who is arrested by the FBI, as the shells match his gun. Leaphorn interviews Peggy McKay, drawing a new profile of McKay and his encounter with Denton. Peggy was not believed by the investigators at that time. McKay's personal effects, still in police storage, do not match the story of the killing as told by Denton. Specifically, McKay's jacket has no pocket large enough for the gun Denton said McKay carried and no blood stains, and the map in his briefcase shows a different place than Denton reported to Leaphorn. Peggy says now and said then that he never carried a gun. Retracing McKay's steps the day of his death, Leaphorn finds that a woman waited in his car as McKay sought materials from the archive at Fort Wingate. He said the woman was his wife, but his wife was not with him; McKay called her to give updates of the time he would arrive home. Leaphorn searches McKay's car to find blonde hairs, the lens of eyeglasses and a receipt for tools. It begins to look like premeditated murder by Denton. Two events occurred the day McKay was murdered, on a past Halloween; the second was a report of a woman wailing, heard by four high school students who were crossing Fort Wingate army munitions depot, a vast place with a long history, used for archives in the bunkers. Leaphorn interviews two of the students who reported the wailing sound and the faint sound of music. Teresa Hano at the archives tells him that Doherty had been there looking at records related to gold mines, as had McKay years earlier.

Professor Bourebonette researches the ownership of the land where Doherty was killed, learning that it comes up for sale at the start of September. Denton has an option to buy it. Leaphorn ends his connection with Denton, because Denton lied to him. Denton persuades him to meet again, trying to take over the encounter in Leaphorn's car with a gun. Leaphorn, who knows the true sequence of events five years earlier, remains in charge by driving to the bunker where they find the mummified body of Denton's wife Linda, and her love note as she waited for him to rescue her. Denton killed McKay so quickly that he gave McKay no chance to mention where Linda was being held hostage, as Denton did not believe that threat. The music she played that night, heard by the passing students intermingled with the sound of the wind, was dismissed as a Halloween prank when police could not find the source. Chee and Manuelito arrive at the bunker, preventing any use of his gun by Denton. Chee arrests Denton for the murder of Doherty. Denton had killed the two who might have spread knowledge of land with the Golden Calf coming up for sale. He lost his wife by his obsession. He involved the unaware Peshlakai in murder charges. Chee and Manuelito each spent time during this case considering the other. Leaphorn encourages Manuelito to tell Chee that she likes him. The horrors of the ending drive her to consider leaving the police, to find a position where she can help people directly.

Characters
 Lt Joe Leaphorn: Widowed, retired from Navajo Tribal Police, still holds title as a county sheriff, and lives in Window Rock, Arizona.
 Sgt. Jim Chee: Single, works in the Navajo Tribal Police, based in Shiprock, New Mexico.
 Albert "Cowboy" Dashee: Deputy Sheriff of Apache County, Arizona and friend to Chee and colleague to Leaphorn. He was introduced in The Dark Wind.
 Bernadette Manuelito: Young patrol officer for the Navajo Tribal Police, reports to Sgt. Chee. She was introduced in The Fallen Man.
 Thomas Doherty: Young man who worked for the US Forest Service, helped with fire suppression, nephew of a former County Sheriff. He is found dead in his vehicle by Officer Manuelito.
 Captain Largo: Superior officer at Shiprock, to both Chee and Manuelito.
 Professor Louisa Bourebonette: Professor of anthropology, specialist in origin stories, Leaphorn's friend, who sometimes uses the spare bedroom as her base for interviews for her research. She was introduced in Coyote Waits.
 Tomas and Gracello Garcia: Two of the four high school students who heard the frightening noises on Halloween five years earlier while taking a shortcut across Fort Wingate and since then, married with children. Leaphorn finds them to ask them again about what happened that night.
 Lorenzo Perez: McKinley County police officer who was part of the initial investigation of McKay's murder, and followed the wife's disappearance, suspecting a crime. Now retired, he calls to tell the guard to allow Leaphorn to enter Fort Wingate to find D2187.
 Ozzie Price: Deputy sheriff in McKinley County who shows Leaphorn the evidence from the five-year-old murder of McKay.
 Jerry Osborne: Special Agent in the Gallup, New Mexico office of the FBI, new since the events in The First Eagle.
 Ralph Harjo: Bureau of Indian affairs agent with Navajo mother who left the reservation in childhood. He serves as the FBI's translator in interviews with Peshlakai.
 Hostiin James Peshlakai: Respected hataalii who lives in his hogan in a canyon near an area sacred to the Navajo for plants and minerals needed for ceremonials. He is suspected of shooting at Officer Manuelito and arrested by the FBI. Chee and Manuelito understand him speaking Navajo, while Harjo misses all the terms related to religious ceremonies. (Name of a real man borrowed for this character, per Author's Note.)
 Hostiin Rodney Yellow: Officer Manuelito's maternal uncle, a shaman and ethnobotanist, who gave her the name Girl Who Laughs.
 Ashton Hoski: Hataalii who agrees to perform the Big Star Way curing ceremonial for Peshalakai, in the season when thunder sleeps, that is, October; Peshlakai requested it the day that Doherty's body was found.
 Teresa Hano: Librarian at the archives in the Army site who recalls the research done by both McKay and Doherty.
 Wiley Denton: Oil and gas magnate, Vietnam war veteran, over 50 years old, long obsessed by old gold mines. He lives in a mansion near Gallup, New Mexico. He served time in jail for killing Marvin McKay.
 Linda Verbiscar Denton: Young blonde wife of Wiley Denton; she worked at a cafe when she met him before she was 21 years old. She has been missing since the day Wiley met McKay.
 Marvin McKay: Killed a few years earlier by Wiley Denton at Denton's home, who claimed self-defense; a patron at the cafe where Linda worked before her marriage, with a record as a con man.
 Peggy McKay: Nurse and common law wife of Marvin McKay, a dark-haired woman.

Allusions
Geographic, botanical, animal, historical, and cultural artifacts and events often play key roles in the plot of this novel. Stories of Navajo culture reveal or explain character motivations or perspectives.

Allusions to literature and culture
"Hostiin" is a respectful form of address to an elder in the Navajo Nation.

Pozole is a regional food, served to Leaphorn during investigation.

In Chapter 13, Leaphorn alludes to the play Othello by Shakespeare, likening Linda's attraction to her husband to that between Desdemona and Othello. Wiley Denton mentions Othello again in Chapter 29, having read the play and seeing the similarity to himself.

In Chapter 15, while discussing his review of the crime scene items boxed up from McKay's murder, Leaphorn refers to a Raymond Chandler mystery, where a key bit of information was found under the toupee of a murdered man, in a room otherwise sacked in search of what Marlowe found. That is part of the novel The Little Sister published in 1949.

The Big Star Way ceremonial requested by Hostiin Peshlakai is one of the many curing ceremonials of the Navajo people.

Real places mentioned in the novel
Doherty's body is found west of the Chuska Mountains just over the line into Apache County, Arizona. Shiprock, New Mexico is the location of Chee's office. Gallup, New Mexico is where the FBI office is located, and Denton's mansion is located just outside the city, in McKinley County. Joe Leaphorn lives in Window Rock, Arizona. Fort Wingate is near Gallup. The fictional alluvial gold mine is located on the Checkerboard part of the Navajo Nation, in New Mexico. This name and ownership situation arose from the way in which land was given to railroads in the 19th century, leaving questions of who owns any specific parcel of land.

Botanical species identified in the plot
Chamisa, sandbur, goathead are the plant seeds Manuelito identifies on Doherty's clothing after touching him to determine he was dead, seeds that do not naturally occur at that site. Aster, mountain columbine are the seeds she collects to plant in her garden. Thread and needle grass, snake weed, Johnson grass are plant life encountered by Manuelito while searching for the site where Doherty was killed.

Allusions to historical events
Leaphorn reads letters in the archives, written in the 19th century about why the Navajo disliked white men seeking gold in their territory. These Navajo archives are kept at Fort Wingate, once a location of old ordnance bunkers, and presently the location of historic archives of U.S. Army Surgeon Washington Matthews. The fort was closed as a base in 1993, but its land and archives are slowly being turned over to other uses, as environmental clean up proceeds. Matthews wrote of famous lost gold mines that were myths of the west in his time, including Lost Adams Diggings and Lost Dutchman's Gold Mine, and is considered the first person to begin accurate documentation of Navajo life and customs. Matthew's books are now saved as part of Project Gutenberg; three are referenced at Many Books. The letter copied in the text is not cited in those books.

Placer mining is a technique for extracting gold (or other precious metals) from alluvial deposits in a stream bed, as Officer Manuelito, and earlier Thomas Doherty, saw in the area exposed by fire.

Geography
In his 2011 book Tony Hillerman's Navajoland: Hideouts, Haunts, and Havens in the Joe Leaphorn and Jim Chee Mysteries, author  has listed the following 63 geographical locations, real and fictional, mentioned in The Wailing Wind.

Albuquerque, New Mexico
Beautiful Mountain, NM
Beclabito, NM
Bisti Badlands, NM
Black Mesa (Apache-Navajo Counties, Arizona)
Bosque Redondo, NM
Burnt Water, Arizona
Carrizo Mountains, AZ
Chaco Canyon National Park, NM
Chaco Mesa, NM
Checkerboard Reservation, NM
Church Rock (Uraninium Mine), NM
Chuska Mountains, NM & AZ
Coconino Plateau, AZ
Cove, AZ
Coyote Canyon, NM
Coyote Canyon Wash, NM
Crownpoint, NM
Cudai Chapter, NM
Dinétah, NM
Farmington, NM
Flagstaff, AZ
Fort Defiance, AZ
Fort Wingate, NM
Gallup, NM
Ganado, AZ
Golden Calf Mine (fictitious location)
Hard Ground Wash, NM
Hogback, NM
Hosta Butte, NM
Iyanbito Refinery, NM
Jicarilla Apache Reservation, NM
Keams Canyon, AZ
Lost Adams Diggings, NM
Lukachukai (Forest), AZ
Lukachukai Mountains, AZ
McGaffey School (fictitious location)
Mesa de los Lobos, NM
Mesa Verde, AZ
Mexican Hat, UT
Mount Taylor, NM
Nakaibito, NM
Nakaibito Trading Post, NM
Red Valley, AZ
Remanent Mesa, NM
Roof Butte, AZ
Rose Well, AZ
Shiprock, New Mexico
Smith Lake, NM
Standing Rock, NM
Sweetwater Chapter House, AZ
Tho-Nii-Tsa, AZ
Thoreau, NM
Toadlena, NM
Tohatchi Lookout, NM
Towoac, CO
Tsale Trading Post (fictitious location)
Two Grey Hills Trading Post, NM
Ute Mountain, UT
White Mountains, AZ
Window Rock, AZ
Zuni Pueblo, NM
Zuni Mountains, NM

Reviews
Marilyn Stasio said that Hillerman is never better than when he is circling a puzzle from various angles, playing with the perceptions of his detectives as well as the reader's. As for the truth . . . well, it's out there, somewhere on the wind.

Kirkus Reviews remarks the top-notch detective work and a solution worthy of the puzzle:

Two years ago, wealthy oil-lease magnate Wiley Denton confessed to shooting Marvin McKay dead—a con man, he testified, whose offer of a partnership in the lost Golden Calf goldmine backfired when he tried to leave Denton’s place with the $50,000 down payment in lieu of any legal agreement—pleaded self-defense, and served his time. Case closed for everybody except Joe Leaphorn, retired Legendary Lieutenant of the Navajo Tribal Police, who’s always wondered what became of Denton’s beautiful young wife Linda, who vanished the day of the killing. Now a second murder has put the case back on the front burner. Officer Bernadette Manuelito has discovered the body of Thomas Doherty, a Forest Service employee who had his old interest in the Golden Calf, in his truck. Trouble is, Bernie didn’t realize Doherty was a murder victim and allowed the crime scene to get so trampled that the Apache County Sheriff’s Department has grabbed the case away from the Tribal Police. Don’t worry about Bernie, though. Before Sgt. Jim Chee, who’s awfully attached to her, can work out a way to cover her misstep, she’s already found the place where Doherty was killed—and begun an investigation that will link both murders to the rumors of a spectral wailing woman at Fort Wingate the Halloween night that Denton shot McKay.

Top-notch detective work by all hands, a solution fully worthy of the puzzle, and all the hard-won wisdom on cultural clashes between Navajos and whites you’d expect from Hillerman (Hunting Badger, 2000, etc.).

Publishers Weekly says Hillerman repeatedly shines in the masterfully complex new novel:

The 15th Chee/Leaphorn mystery (after 1999's relatively weak Hunting Badger) finds MWA Grand Master Hillerman back at the top of his form as his two Navajo peace officers look into both a past and present mystery. Religious fervency and single-minded greed become strange but necessary bedfellows in a plot filled, as always, with insights into the lives and beliefs of the "Dineh." When an abandoned pickup truck turns out to contain one very dead white man, Sgt. Jim Chee's instincts lead him to bring retired Lt. Joe Leaphorn into the case. Leaphorn's trademark curiosity sends him in search of possible links between this homicide and another two years earlier. The first murder occurred on Halloween day when Wiley Denton supposedly shot Marvin McKay in self-defense after McKay tried to sell him bogus information about an old gold mine. That same day Denton's wife, Linda, disappeared; she has never been heard from again. Leaphorn's recollection of what had been shrugged off as a Halloween prank out at old Fort Wingate now becomes the itch he has to scratch. It seems a group of teens shortcutting across the area had endured a close call with La Llorana, a mythical wailing woman. The information he gathers adds yet another piece to the puzzle of the missing Linda. Chee is up to his elbows in not only the investigation but also in sorting through his growing emotional confusion about the beautiful Bernadette Manuelito. The seemingly insignificant turns critical and the loose ends tie up in one tidy conclusion as Hillerman repeatedly shines in this masterfully complex new novel.

See also
 Bureau of Land Management
 Diné Bahaneʼ
 Placer mining
 Methods of Placer mining

References

Bibliography

External links
 Smithsonian Institution Research Information System (SIRIS) Archives For Army Surgeon Washington Matthews
 Free on-line access to selected papers of Washington Matthews
Google Books limited preview of  The Wailing Wind
The Wailing Wind at Tony Hillerman Portal

2002 American novels
Novels by Tony Hillerman
Novels set in Arizona
Novels set in New Mexico
HarperCollins books